No. 623 Squadron RAF was a heavy bomber squadron of the Royal Air Force for several months in 1943 during the Second World War.

History
The squadron was formed on 10 August 1943 at RAF Downham Market in Norfolk from 'C' Flight of 218 Squadron, as well as receiving crews from No.3 L.F.S. and No.1653 Conversion Unit. It was equipped with Stirling Mk.III bombers, as part of No. 3 Group RAF in Bomber Command. The squadron carried out night raids against Germany, but was short-lived and was disbanded on 6 December 1943 at Downham Market. The aircraft went mostly to conversion units of No. 5 Group RAF.

Commanding officers

Notable personnel
Flt Lt John Henry Smythe, a black navigator from Sierra Leone, who was shot down and captured, and later became a Queen's Counsel barrister and the attorney general of Sierra Leone.

Aircraft operated

Some examples:
 BF568: IC-B Taken over from No. 218 Squadron RAF, later to No. 214 Squadron RAF and 1651 Heavy Conversion Unit (HCU). Struck of charge 24.4.45
 BK727: IC-A Taken over from No. 218 Squadron, later to No. 214 Squadron and 1651 HCU. Struck of charge 24.4.45
 BK803: IC-S and IC-D Taken over from No. 218 Squadron, later to 1654 HCU. Crashed 30.6.44
 EE876: IC-T Taken over from No. 218 Squadron, later to 1654 HCU. Struck of charge 25.4.46
 EE966: IC-E Taken over from No. 218 Squadron, later transferred to No. 299 Squadron RAF. Crashed 11.5.45 at Gardermoen, Norway
 EF199: IC-I Went to No. 214 Squadron RAF and later to 1651 HCU. Struck of charge 24.4.45
 EF204: IC-E Went to 1654 Conversion Unit after its service life with No. 623 Squadron, crashed 14.1.45
 EH878: IC-I Failed to return from a bombing mission to Mannheim, 6.9.43
 EH925: IC-C Failed to return from bombing mission to Berlin, 23/24.08.43. Aircraft crashed 10 km south of Zossen, crew killed. Crash site has now been discovered in local area.
 EJ121: IC-Q Went to 1654 Conversion Unit after its service life with No. 623 Squadron. Struck of charge 28.2.45
 LJ454: IC-E Failed to return from a bombing mission to Mannheim, 19.11.43
 LK387: IC-P Failed to return on 5.12.43 on a mine laying operation at the Friesian Islands

Operations

 Despatched – number of aircraft taking off
 DCO – Duty Carried Out
 Alt – Alternative target attacked
 DNCO – Duty Not Carried Out (sortie aborted)
 Gardening – laying anti-shipping mines in coastal waters
 Comments – code names for area where mines dropped and identity of losses.

See also
 List of Royal Air Force aircraft squadrons
 List of Royal Air Force heavy conversion units

References

Notes

Bibliography

 No. 623 Squadron Operational Record Book (Forms 540/541), National Archives, Kew (AIR 27/2141).

External links
 Squadron history on RAF website
 No. 623 Squadron RAF movement and equipment history
 No 621 - 650 Squadron Histories

Bomber squadrons of the Royal Air Force in World War II
Military units and formations established in 1943
Military units and formations disestablished in 1943